"L'Aziza" is the name of a 1985 song recorded by French singer Daniel Balavoine and released as a single from his album Sauver l'amour in October 1985. The song was very successful, particularly after the singer's death, topping the chart in France for two months.

Song information
The song was entirely composed by Balavoine, and was produced by the famous composer Léo Missir.

'L'Aziza' means 'My dear' in Arabic, although all the lyrics are sung in French. In this song, Balavoine pays tribute to his Jewish Moroccan wife Corinne, and denounces racism. In France, "L'Aziza" became a standard song throughout the years.

The song was remixed the same year of the album release and came out as a 7". It features on Balavoine's best of Balavoine sans frontières, released about twenty years after the singer's death.

The music video was directed by Oliver Chavarot.

Cover versions
"L'Aziza" was also recorded in 2000 by Khaled for the compilation album Balavoine: Hommages... on which various artists covered Balavoine's songs. The song was also covered in France by Star Academy 5 for its album Chante Daniel Balavoine, on which it features as fifth track.

The B-side, "Tous les cris, les S.O.S.", was covered by many artists, including Jeanne Mas in 1987, Marie-Denise Pelletier, Lena Kann in 1998 (#14 in France) and Les Enfoirés in 2008.

Chart performances
"L'Aziza" entered the French Singles Chart at #40 on November 23, 1985, and gained a few places every week, but when the singer's death was announced in the media, the single jumped straight to #1 and stayed there for eight consecutive weeks, with huge weekly sales. Thereafter, it dropped rather quickly and remained for 14 weeks in the top ten and for 26 weeks in the top 50.

It was certified Platinum by SNEP in 1985 for selling 1 million copies in France.

Track listings
 7" single
 "L'Aziza" — 4:21
 "Tous les cris, les S.O.S." — 5:04

Certifications and sales

Charts

Weekly charts

Year-end charts

References

1985 singles
Daniel Balavoine songs
SNEP Top Singles number-one singles
Songs written by Daniel Balavoine
Barclay (record label) singles
1985 songs
Songs against racism and xenophobia